Credit Union Deposit Guarantee Corporation may refer to:
Credit Union Deposit Guarantee Corporation (Alberta)
Credit Union Deposit Guarantee Corporation (Newfoundland and Labrador)
Credit Union Deposit Guarantee Corporation (Saskatchewan)